The Kyoto Consortium for Japanese Studies (KCJS; Japanese: 京都アメリカ大学コンソーシアム) is an intensive, in-country program for the study of Japanese language and culture located in Kyoto, Japan. Operating under the auspices of 13 US universities, KCJS delivers summer, semester, and year-long curricula that are academically rigorous and culturally immersive. KCJS is based in the center of Kyoto on the campus of Doshisha University. Students engage in rigorous language and disciplinary courses that lay the foundations for linguistic fluency and cultural literacy. 

 KCJS has educated over 750 students. 

Columbia University's Center for Undergraduate Global Engagement provides lead administration on the US side, handling admissions and fees.

KCJS is open to undergraduates from all institutions, both within and outside the consortium.

Consortium members 

 Boston University
 Brown University
 University of Chicago
 Columbia University/Barnard College (current administrating university)
 Cornell University
 Emory University
 Harvard University
 University of Pennsylvania
 Princeton University
 Stanford University
 Washington University in St. Louis
 Yale University
 University of Virginia

Notes

See also 
Kyoto
Japanese language
Study abroad

References

External links
 KCJS homepage
 KCJS at Columbia University
   - Home page of the Stanford Japan Center, the former location of the program

Universities and colleges in Japan
1989 establishments in Japan
Japanese studies